Alstonia venenata is a plant of the family Apocynaceae. It grows as a shrub or small tree in low to mid elevation deciduous forests of India. The bark of the plant and, sometimes, the fruit, are used for medicinal purposes.

References

venenata